Lygaeospilus is a genus of seed bugs in the family Lygaeidae. There are at least four described species in Lygaeospilus.

Species
These four species belong to the genus Lygaeospilus:
 Lygaeospilus brevipilus Scudder, 1981
 Lygaeospilus fusconervosus Barber, 1948
 Lygaeospilus pusio (Stal, 1874)
 Lygaeospilus tripunctatus (Dallas, 1852)

References

Further reading

 
 

Lygaeidae
Articles created by Qbugbot